The Olde Woolen Mill (also known as the North Berwick Woolen Mill) is a historic mill complex at Canal Street, on the Great Works River in the center of North Berwick, Maine.  Built in 1862, it is the only major mill complex in the Berwick region of York County.  It was listed on the National Register of Historic Places in 1983.

Description and history
The mill is located between Canal Street and the Great Works River, just south of Wells Street (Maine State Route 9) in the village center of North Berwick.  The associated mill pond is located just north of Wells Street.  The mill complex is a somewhat typical 19th century New England mill complex, with a large rectangular main building, with a series of attached wings.  The complex exhibits an eclectic mixture of architectural detailing, including elements of Greek Revival, Italianate, and Colonial Revival styling.

An earlier wooden mill built on the site in 1832 was destroyed by fire, and the existing brick structure built in 1862. Primarily owned by Quakers, the mill, one of the first to automate the manufacture of blankets, produced uniforms and blankets for Union soldiers during the American Civil War. At its foundation level has been preserved one of the earliest steam engines in the United States, and the only one of its kind to survive.

The mill closed in 1955 and remained mostly unused for nearly 40 years, when it served as the site of the Parrish Shoe Factory in the 1995 fantasy movie Jumanji. In 2009 the structure was renovated into a senior housing site by the Caleb Group, a nonprofit housing organization of New England. It was the first property to be awarded a tax credit under the Maine State Historic Rehabilitation Tax Credit Act of 2008.

See also
National Register of Historic Places listings in York County, Maine

References

External links 
 
 Official web page for The Olde Woolen Mill
 "Old North Berwick mill now affordable housing for older residents" by Jason Claffey, in Foster's Daily Democrat (27 October 2009)
 "Old Maine mill gets new lease on life" by Deborah McDermott in Seacoastonline.com (30 August 2009) 
 Profile at Tremont Preservation Services
 Historical sites in or around North Berwick, Maine, in The Maine Encyclopedia

Industrial buildings and structures on the National Register of Historic Places in Maine
Georgian architecture in Maine
Victorian architecture in Maine
Buildings and structures completed in 1862
Buildings and structures in York County, Maine
North Berwick, Maine
Textile mills in Maine
1862 establishments in Maine
National Register of Historic Places in York County, Maine
Woollen mills